Brunswick Troops in the American Revolutionary War served as auxiliaries to the British Army during the American Revolutionary War, in accordance with the treaty of 1776 between Great Britain and the Principality of Brunswick-Wolfenbüttel. Four regiments of foot, one regiment of dragoons, one grenadier battalion, and one light battalion with a Jäger company were dispatched to British America. Most of the Brunswick troops fought at the Battles of Saratoga, where they were forced to surrender as part of British General John Burgoyne's army. A total of 5,723 soldiers were sent overseas, and 2,708 returned to Brunswick-Wolfenbüttel. Part of the difference can be attributed to casualties, but the rest chose to remain in the United States or Canada instead of returning to Europe. Over the course of the war, the British government paid the Prince of Brunswick-Wolfenbüttel a total of £750,000 for the use of his army.

Background

At the outbreak of the American Revolutionary War, Britain felt the need to augment her troops with German auxiliaries, as it had done in previous wars.  Duke Charles I was the reigning Duke of Brunswick-Wolfenbüttel; his son and heir, Charles William Ferdinand, was married to Princess Augusta of Great Britain, the sister of George III. The Brunswick army had previously served alongside the British during the Seven Years' War (1756-63), successfully campaigning in the Low Countries, but had not been used since. Colonel William Faucitt, the British emissary, entered into negotiations with Brunswick, and the outcome was the first auxiliary troop treaty of the war between Great Britain and a German state.

Treaty
The treaty between Brunswick and Great Britain was ratified January 9, 1776. It stipulated that Brunswick would make a corps of 3,964 foot and 336 light horse available to Great Britain for service in Europe or America. The corps had to be properly officered, and the men ready for campaign service; the corps had to be fully equipped with the exception of the horses for the cavalry. The corps should be formed into five regiments and two battalions. Brunswick would maintain the number of men in the corps through annual recruitment if necessary. Britain would give the corps the same pay and allowances as enjoyed by British troops, and wounded soldiers would be treated in British military hospitals in the same way as British troops. As levy money Britain would pay 30 Banco-Thaler per man; the Thaler valued at 4 shilling, 9 3/4 pence sterling. For each man killed, or three man wounded, the same amount would be paid. For each year of service, Britain should pay 64,500 Banco-Thaler to the Duke of Brunswick.

Troops raised

Treaty stipulations
In an appendix to the treaty between Great Britain and Brunswick, the number and composition of the troops to be raised were stipulated in detail: 
 General staff, 22 officers and other ranks.
 Regiment of foot
 Staff, 25 officers and other ranks.
 Company of foot, 131 officers and other ranks.
 With five companies, a regiment of foot contained 680 officers and other ranks.
 Battalion of grenadiers
 Staff, 8 officers and other ranks.
 Company of grenadiers, 139 officers and other ranks.
 With four companies of grenadiers, the battalion contained 564 officers and other ranks.
 Regiment of dragoons
 Staff, 24 officers and other ranks.
 Company of dragoons, 78 officers and other ranks.
 With four companies of dragoons, the regiment contained 336 officers and other ranks.
 Light battalion 
 Staff, 11 officers and other ranks.
 Company of chasseurs, 147 officers and other ranks.
 Light company, 125 officers and other ranks.
 With one company of chasseurs and four light companies, the battalion contained 658 officers and other ranks.

Units
The Commander of the Brunswick Corps, which also included troops from Hesse-Hanau, was Major General Friedrich Adolf Riedesel. The Brunswick regiments were:    
Dragoon Regiment Prinz Ludwig, Lieutenant Colonel Friedrich Baum.
Musketeer Regiment Prinz Friedrich, Lieutenant Colonel Christian Julius Prätorius
Musketeer Regiment Riedesel, Lieutenant Colonel Ernst Ludwig Wilhelm von Speth.
Musketeer Regiment Specht, Colonel Johann Friedrich von Specht.
Musketeer Regt von Rhetz, Lieutenant Colonel Johann Gustav von Ehrenkrook.
Grenadier Battalion von Breymann, Lieutenant Colonel Heinrich von Breymann.
Light Infantry Battalion von Barner, Lieutenant Colonel Ferdinand Albrecht von Barner.
 Regiment von Ehrenkrook, Lieutenant Colonel Johann Gustav von Ehrenkrook, created in Canada in 1778; contained a mixed battalion von Ehrenkrook, made up of troops that escaped becoming prisoners-of-war at Saratoga, and the battalion von Barner.

Numbers

The total subsidies paid to Brunswick-Wolfenbüttel for these troops were 5,250,000 Banco-Thaler, or 750,000 pound sterling.

Campaigns
The Brunswick Corps participated in the Siege of Ticonderoga, Battle of Bennington, Battle of Freeman's Farm, Battle of Bemis Heights. The corps, except Regiment Prinz Friedrich (remained at Fort Ticonderoga) and Battalion von Barner, surrendered at Saratoga and became prisoners of war in the Convention Army.

References

Citations

Cited literature
 Atwood, Rodney (1980). The Hessians. Cambridge University Press.
 Davenport, Frances Gardner & Paullin, Charles Oscar (1937). European treaties bearing on the history of the United States and its dependencies. Volume IV: 1716-1815. Washington.
 Eelking, Max von (1863). Die deutschen Hülfstruppen im nordamerikanischem Befreiungskriege, 1776 bis 1783. Hannover.
 Huck, Stephan (2011). Soldaten gegen Nordamerika. München: Oldenbourg Verlag.
 Jarck, Horst-Rüdiger (ed.) (2000). Brücken in eine neue Welt. Wiesbaden: Harrassowitz.
 Lowell, Edward J. (1884). The Hessians. New York.
 Scales, Jodie K. (2001). Of Kindred Germanic Origins. Writers Club Press.

External Links
 

German units in British service in the American Revolutionary War